Wang Bojun (born 2 March 1991) is a Chinese footballer currently playing as a midfielder for Jiangxi Beidamen.

Career statistics

Club
.

Notes

References

1991 births
Living people
Chinese footballers
Association football midfielders
China League Two players
China League One players
Nanjing Qianbao F.C. players
Anhui Hefei Guiguan F.C. players
Jiangxi Beidamen F.C. players